Kakinomoto no Hitomaro (柿本 人麻呂 or 柿本 人麿;  – ) was a Japanese waka poet and aristocrat of the late Asuka period. He was the most prominent of the poets included in the Man'yōshū, the oldest waka anthology, but apart from what can be gleaned from hints in the Man'yōshū, the details of his life are largely uncertain. He was born to the Kakinomoto clan, based in Yamato Province, probably in the 650s, and likely died in Iwami Province around 709.

He served as court poet to Empress Jitō, creating many works praising the imperial family, and is best remembered for his elegies for various imperial princes. He also composed well-regarded travel poems.

He is ranked as one of the Thirty-six Poetry Immortals. Ōtomo no Yakamochi, the presumed compiler of the Man'yōshū, and Ki no Tsurayuki, the principal compiler of the Kokin Wakashū, praised Hitomaro as Sanshi no Mon (山柿の門) and Uta no Hijiri (歌の聖) respectively. From the Heian period on, he was often called Hito-maru (人丸). He has come to be revered as a god of poetry and scholarship, and is considered one of the four greatest poets in Japanese history, along with Fujiwara no Teika, Sōgi and Bashō.

Life

Sources 
The sole early source for the life of the poet Kakinomoto no Hitomaro is the Man'yōshū. His name does not appear in any of the official court documents, perhaps on account of his low rank.

Ancestry 

Hitomaro was born into the Kakinomoto clan, an offshoot of the ancient . Centred in the northeastern part of the Nara Basin, the Wani clan had furnished many imperial consorts in the fourth through sixth centuries, and extended their influence from Yamato Province to Yamashiro, Ōmi, Tanba and Harima provinces. Many of their clan traditions (including genealogies, songs, and tales) are preserved in the Nihon Shoki and, especially, the Kojiki. The Kakinomoto clan were headquartered in either Shinjō, Nara or, perhaps more likely, the Ichinomoto area of Tenri, Nara. The main Wani clan were also based in this area, so the Kakinomoto clan may have had a particularly close relationship with their parent clan. According to the Shinsen Shōjiroku, the clan's name derives from the persimmon (kaki) tree that grew on their land during the reign of Emperor Bidatsu.

The Kakinomoto clan had their hereditary title promoted from Omi to Ason in the eleventh month (see Japanese calendar) of 684. According to the Nihon Shoki, Kakinomoto no Saru, the probable head of the clan, had been among ten people appointed , equivalent to Junior Fifth Rank, in the twelfth month of 681. These facts lead Watase to conjecture that the Kakinomoto clan may have had some literary success in the court of Emperor Tenmu. According to the Shoku Nihongi, Saru died in 708, having attained the Junior Fourth Rank, Lower Grade.

There are several theories regarding the relationship of this Kakinomoto no Saru to the poet Hitomaro, including the former being the latter's father, brother, uncle, or them being the same person. The theory that they were the same person has been advanced by Takeshi Umehara, but has little supporting evidence. While the other theories cannot be confirmed, it is certain that they were members of the same clan (probably close relatives), and were active at the same time. It is likely that their mutual activity at court had a significant effect on each other.

Birth and early life 
The year in which he was born is not known, nor can much be said with certainty about any aspects of his life beyond his poetic activities. Watase tentatively takes Hitomaro as being 21 years old (by Japanese reckoning) between 673 and 675, which would put his birth between 653 and 655.

Emperor Tenmu's reign 
The earliest dated work attributed to him in the Man'yōshū is his Tanabata poem (Man'yōshū 2033) composed in the ninth year of Emperor Tenmu's reign (680). The content of this poem reveals an awareness of the mythology that, according to the preface to the Kojiki (completed in 712) had begun to be compiled during Tenmu's reign. Watase also observes that Hitomaro's having composed a Tanabata poem means that he was probably attending Tanabata gatherings during this period. A significant number of poems in the Kakinomoto no Ason Hitomaro Kashū were apparently recorded by Hitomaro before 690, and are characteristic of court poetry, leading to the conclusion that he was active at court from the early part of Emperor Tenmu's reign. From this point he was active in recording and composing love poems at court.

Based on Hitomaro's poetic activities during Empress Jitō's reign, there are a few possibilities for where Hitomaro was serving at Tenmu's court. Watase presents three principal theories: first under the empress-consort Princess Uno-no-sarara (who later became Empress Jitō); second under Crown Prince Kusakabe; third in the palace of Prince Osakabe.

Reigns of Empress Jitō and Emperor Monmu 

Hitomaro acted as a court poet during the reigns of Empress Jitō and Emperor Monmu. In the fourth month of 689, Prince Kusakabe died, and Hitomaro composed an elegy commemorating the prince. He also composed an elegy for Princess Asuka, who died in the fourth month of 700, and a poem commemorating an imperial visit to Kii Province.

His poetic composition flourished during the period in which Empress Jitō was active (both during her reign and after her retirement). He composed poetry for numerous members of the imperial family, including the empress, Prince Kusakabe, Prince Karu, Prince Takechi, Prince Osakabe, Prince Naga, Prince Yuge, Prince Toneri, Princess Hatsusebe and Princess Asuka. He apparently composed poetry in Yamato Province (his home), Yamashiro Province and Ōmi Province in the north, Kii Province in the south, Shikoku, Kyūshū and the Seto Inland Sea in the west, as well as Iwami Province in the northwest.

Susumu Nakanishi remarks that the fact that he did not apparently compose elegies for emperors themselves, and that most of his poems centre around princes and princesses, indicates that he was probably a writer affiliated with the literary circles that formed around these junior members of the imperial family.

Later life and death 
The ordering of poems, and their headnotes, in volume 2 of the Man'yōshū, implies that Hitomaro died shortly before the moving of the capital to Nara in 710. He would have been in Iwami Province, at the Sixth Rank or lower.

The date, site and manner of his death are a matter of scholarly debate, due to some contradictory details that are gleaned from poems attributed to Hitomaro and his wife . Taking Watase's rough dates, he would have been in his mid-fifties in 709, when Watase speculates he died. Mokichi Saitō postulated that Hitomaro died in an epidemic that swept Iwami and Izumo provinces in 707. Hitomaro's final poem gives the strong impression that he met his death in the mountains.

Saitō was convinced he had located the site of the Kamoyama of the above poem and erected a monument there, but two poems by Yosami that immediately follow the above in the Man'yōshū suggest otherwise, as they mention "shells" (貝 kai) and a "Stone River" (石川 Ishikawa), neither of which seem likely in the context of Saitō's Kamoyama.

The above-quoted translation is based on Saitō's interpretation of kai as referring to a "ravine" (峡). Other scholars take the presence of "shells" as meaning Hitomaro died near the mouth of a river where it meets the sea. (This interpretation would give the translation "Alas! he lies buried, men say, / With the shells of the Stone River.")

There is no river named "Ishikawa" near the present Kamoyama; Saitō explained this as "Ishikawa" perhaps being an archaic name for upper part of another river.

An unknown member of the Tajihi clan wrote a response to Yosami in the persona of Hitomaro, very clearly connecting Hitomaro's death to the sea.

Works 

Hitomaro was a court poet during the reigns of Empress Jitō and Emperor Monmu, with most of his dateable poems coming from the last decade or so of the seventh century. He apparently left a private collection, the so-called Kakinomoto no Ason Hitomaro Kashū, which does not survive as an independent work but was cited extensively by the compilers of the Man'yōshū.

18 chōka and 67 tanka (of which 36 are envoys to his long poems) are directly attributed to him in the Man'yōshū. All are located in the first four books of the collection. Of these, six chōka and 29 tanka are classified as zōka (miscellaneous poems), three chōka and 13 tanka as sōmon (mutual exchanges of love poetry), and nine chōka and 25 tanka as banka (elegies). Of note is the fact that he contributed chōka to all three categories, and that he composed so many banka.

Broken down by topic, the above poems include:
seven chōka and 28 tanka about court women, including the three tanka he composed on the court women accompanying Empress Jitō on her visit to Ise while he stayed in the capital, one chōka and eight tanka mourning Kibitsu no Uneme, Hijikata no Otome and Izumo no Otome, and a number of romantic exchanges with his wife and other lovers;
one chōka and three tanka commemorating the bodies of dead people Hitomaro encountered;
14 tanka composed on travel topics that do not fit into any of the above categories (all of which also include travel poems).
From the above it can be said that Hitomaro's poetry was primarily about affairs of the court, but that he also showed a marked preference for poems on travel.

In addition to the 85 poems directly attributed to Hitomaro by the Man'yōshū, two chōka and three tanka in books 3 and 9 are said to be traditionally attributed to Hitomaro. Additionally, there is one Hitomaro tanka in book 15 said to have been recited in 736 by an envoy sent to Silla. Including these "traditional" Hitomaro poems, that gives 20 chōka and 71 tanka. It is quite possible that a significant number of these poems were incorrectly attributed to Hitomaro by tradition. In addition to Hitomaro's own compositions, there are also many poems said to have been recorded by him in his personal collection, the Kakinomoto no Asomi Hitomaro Kashū (柿本朝臣人麿歌集). The Hitomaro Kashū included 333 tanka, 35 sedōka, and two chōka. This adds up to a total figure of close to 500 poems directly associated with Hitomaro.

Characteristic style 
Hitomaro is known for his solemn and mournful elegies of members of the imperial family, whom he described in his courtly poems as "gods" and "children of the sun". He incorporated elements of the national mythology seen in the Kojiki and Nihon Shoki and historical narrative in his poetry. While he is known for his poems praising the imperial family, his poetry is also filled with human sensitivity and a new, fresh "folkiness".

His lament for the Ōmi capital is noted for its vivid, sentimental descriptions of the ruins, while his elegy for Prince Takechi powerfully evokes the Jinshin War. His Yoshino and  poems praise splendidly the natural scenery and the divinity of the Japanese islands, and his Iwami exchange vividly describes the powerful emotions of being separated from the woman he loved. His romantic poems convey honest emotions, and his travel poems exquisitely describe the mood of the courtiers on these trips. He shed tears for the deaths of even random commoners on country paths and court women whose names he did not even know.

Watase credits him with the creation of an ancient lyricism that expressed both human sentiment and sincere emotions across both his poems of praise and mourning.

Reception

There is evidence that Hitomaro exerted direct influence on the poetry composed during his own time. For example, poems 171 through 193 of Book 1 of the Man'yōshū bear similarities to his work. It is generally accepted that the court poets of the following generation (the so-called "third period" of Man'yō poetry), including Yamabe no Akahito, were influenced by Hitomaro's courtly poems. Ōtomo no Yakamochi, a poet of the "fourth period" who probably had a hand in the final compilation of the collection, held Hitomaro in high regard, praising him as Sanshi no Mon (山柿の門). As discussed above, the death of Hitomaro appears to have already taken on some legendary characteristics.

In his Japanese preface to the tenth-century Kokin Wakashū, Ki no Tsurayuki referred to Hitomaro as Uta no Hijiri ("Saint of Poetry"). In the Heian period the practice of Hitomaru-eigu (人丸影供) also gained currency, showing that Hitomaro had already begun to be apotheosized. Hitomaro's divinity status continued to grow in the Kamakura and Muromachi periods. The Edo period scholars Keichū and Kamo no Mabuchi tended to reject the various legends about Hitomaro.

In Akashi, Hyōgo Prefecture there is a Kakinomoto Shrine dedicated to him, commemorating an early Heian belief that Hitomaro's spirit came to rest in Akashi, an area the historical Hitomaro probably visited multiple times.

Hitomaro is today ranked, along with Fujiwara no Teika, Sōgi and Bashō, as one of the four greatest poets in Japanese history.

Notes

References

Works cited

External links

 Kenneth Rexroth's One Hundred Poems from the Japanese (New Directions, 1955) contains several of Hitomaro's waka, as well as notable translations of 3 naga uta ("In the sea of ivy clothed Iwami", "The Bay of Tsyunu", and "When she was still alive")

 
Japanese male poets
Man'yō poets
650s births
700s deaths
7th-century Japanese poets
Hyakunin Isshu poets
Deified Japanese people